Kakaji Maharaj (1918–1986) was the devotee of Swaminarayan. He belonged to the Swaminarayan faith. The Government of India issued a commemorative postage stamp on Kakaji Maharaj in 2003.

References

External links 
 www.kakaji.org

People from Gujarat
Swaminarayan Sampradaya
Indian Hindu monks
1918 births
1986 deaths
20th-century Indian philosophers